Edward Pollard  is a Houston politician that represents District J of the Houston City Council.

Personal life and education
Pollard was born in Southwest Houston, and attended Houston Independent School District schools. He attended Morehouse College in Atlanta, Georgia on a basketball scholarship. He graduated with a bachelor's degree in political science. He played professional basketball internationally in Singapore, Chile, and other South American countries. He then returned to Houston and earned a Juris Doctor from Thurgood Marshall School of Law, and later, from Harvard Business School,  received a Certificate in Negotiation Mastery. Pollard is the principal owner of  Pollard Legal Group, LLC, which is a civil litigation law firm. Additionally, he founded Suits for Success which is a 501(c)3 organization that helps teenage boys develop life skills. He is member of Antioch Missionary Baptist Church, and has a wife and 2 children.

Political career
Pollard is considered to be a centrist or more conservative Democrat. He was sworn in on January 2, 2020 to represent District J of the Houston City Council.

References

Living people
Year of birth missing (living people)
Harvard Business School alumni
Thurgood Marshall School of Law alumni
Morehouse Maroon Tigers basketball players
Texas Democrats
Houston City Council members